Diesch is a German surname. Notable people with the surname include:

Eckart Diesch (born 1954), German sailor
Jörg Diesch (born 1951), German sailor
Kellen Diesch (born 2000), American football player
Otto Diesch (born 1896), Argentine sprinter

German-language surnames